David Matthew Rick is an American guitarist and former member of underground rock bands B.A.L.L., Bongwater,  King Missile, Phantom Tollbooth, When People Were Shorter and Lived Near the Water, Wonderama, and Yo La Tengo. He is a member of Atlantic Drone, The Martinets, McLoud, Overcat, Stress Test and Wide Right. His latest band is Bob Carol Ted, which features artist/drummer Steve DiBenedetto

Selected discography

Notes

References
Strong, Martin C. (2003) The Great Indie Discography, Canongate, 
True, Chris "Phantom Tollbooth Biography", Allmusic, retrieved 2011-08-03

External links
[ Dave Rick entry at Allmusic.com]
Dave Rick entry at Discogs.com

Living people
American rock guitarists
American male guitarists
King Missile members
Yo La Tengo members
Bongwater (band) members
Year of birth missing (living people)
When People Were Shorter and Lived Near the Water members